German submarine U-118 was a Type XB minelaying U-boat of Nazi Germany's Kriegsmarine during World War II.

She was ordered	on 31 January 1939 and laid down on 1 March 1940 at the Friedrich Krupp Germaniawerft in Kiel, as yard number 617. She was launched on 23 September 1941 and commissioned on 6 December under the command of Korvettenkapitän Werner Czygan.

After a period of training as part of the 4th U-boat Flotilla, U-118 was assigned to the front-line as part of the 10th U-boat Flotilla on 1 October 1942. She was reassigned to the 12th flotilla a month later on 1 November. She was a member of three wolfpacks.

Operational career

First patrol
U-118s first patrol began on 19 September 1942 with her departure from Kiel. Her route took her across the North Sea, through the 'gap' between Iceland and the Faroe Islands and into the Atlantic Ocean. The boat was attacked south of Iceland by an aircraft on 29 September which caused only slight damage. She reached her destination, which was Lorient in occupied France, on 16 October.

Second patrol
Her second sortie was to an area between the Azores and Madeira. It was uneventful.

She carried out a short transit voyage from Lorient to Brest on 12 and 13 December 1942.

Third patrol
The boat's third patrol was the longest, but most successful. Departing Brest on 25 January 1943, she sailed west of Gibraltar, where she sank Baltonia, Empire Mordred and Mary Slessor on 7 February and damaged Duero with a mine on the tenth. She was also responsible for the sinking of the corvette  on 22 February. The Canadian ship struck a mine that U-118 had laid on the first. Despite best efforts by the crew to remove depth charge primers, two exploded when the ship sank, killing men in the water and disabling a nearby destroyer. U-118 returned to France, to Bordeaux, on 26 February.

Fourth patrol and loss
U-118 had been at sea less than a month when she was attacked by two aircraft west of the Canary Islands followed by a further eight planes from the carrier . Following a heavy expenditure of bombs, .50" and .30" ammunition; the U-boat exploded into two parts, oil and debris were flung into the air. 16 men survived to be picked up by the escort vessel .

She was sunk in position

Wolfpacks
U-118 took part in three wolfpacks, namely:
 Wotan (5 – 7 October 1942)
 Westwall (28 – 30 November 1942)
 Rochen (13 – 14 February 1943)

Summary of raiding history

References

Notes

Citations

Bibliography

External links

 
 U-118 at ubootwaffe.net

German Type X submarines
U-boats commissioned in 1941
U-boats sunk in 1943
U-boats sunk by US aircraft
World War II submarines of Germany
World War II shipwrecks in the Atlantic Ocean
1941 ships
Ships built in Kiel
Maritime incidents in June 1943